S. S. Chandran (25 September 1941 – 9 October 2010) was an Indian comedy actor, producer, and politician from Tamil Nadu. He belonged to the All India Anna Dravida Munnetra Kazhagam party and was a Member of the Parliament representing Tamil Nadu in the Rajya Sabha, the upper house of the Indian Parliament.

Personal life
His son Rohit has acted in one film Oru Murai Sollividu (2004).

Film career
He has acted in over 700 films, having started performing at the age of 15. He first acted in dramas which were staged in and around Tamil Nadu and later in Sri Lanka. Among his more popular films are: Sahadevan Mahadevan, Thangamani Rangamani, Paati Sollai Thattathey, and Kathanayagan. Chandran has also produced four films.

Partial filmography
Actor

Producer & Director

Dubbing artist

Death
He had a heart attack and died on October 9, 2010. He had undergone a heart bypass surgery in 2009.

References

External links
 

Rajya Sabha members from Tamil Nadu
All India Anna Dravida Munnetra Kazhagam politicians
2010 deaths
Tamil comedians
1941 births
Indian male film actors
Male actors in Tamil cinema